Gloxinia is a genus containing three species of tropical rhizomatous herbs in the flowering plant family Gesneriaceae. The species are primarily found in the Andes of South America, but Gloxinia perennis is also found in Central America and the West Indies, where it has probably escaped from cultivation.

Gloxinia perennis is the original (type) species of the genus, and for much of its history the genus consisted of only G. perennis and a very small number of other species. The classification of Gloxinia later changed reflect the 1976 classification of Hans Wiehler, who took a broader view of the genus. A recent analysis of Gloxinia and related genera based on molecular and morphological work has determined that Wiehler's circumscription of the genus was unnatural, both phylogenetically and morphologically. The analyses demonstrated that the genera Anodiscus and Koellikeria, each with a single species, were more closely related to Gloxinia perennis than were any of the other species included in Gloxinia by Wiehler, several of which proved to be more closely related to other genera (particularly Diastema, Monopyle, and Phinaea). As a result of this work, most former Gloxinia species have been transferred to other genera while Koellikeria erinoides and Anodiscus xanthophyllus have been transferred into a much more narrowly defined Gloxinia consisting of only three species, all of them characterized by having a raceme-like flowering stem.

Former Gloxinia species have been transferred to a large number of other genera, including the existing genera Monopyle and Sinningia, the resurrected genera Mandirola and Seemannia, and the new genera Gloxinella, Gloxiniopsis, Nomopyle, and Sphaerorrhiza.

Gloxinia perennis forms fertile hybrids with species of Seemannia, which was the primary reason for uniting the two genera in the past.

Sinningia speciosa, a popular houseplant, was originally described and introduced into cultivation as Gloxinia speciosa and is still sometimes referred to as "gloxinia" or "florist's gloxinia", although this name is now inaccurate and technically incorrect. Similarly, "hardy gloxinia" is Incarvillea delavayi, a member of the Bignoniaceae.

Species 

Selected excluded species

Gloxinia burchellii = Sphaerorrhiza burchellii
Gloxinia dodsonii = Nomopyle dodsonii
Gloxinia gymnostoma = Seemannia gymnostoma
Gloxinia hirsuta = Sinningia hirsuta
Gloxinia ichthyostoma = Mandirola ichthyostoma
Gloxinia lindeniana = Gloxinella lindeniana
Gloxinia nematanthodes = Seemannia nematanthodes
Gloxinia planalta = Mandirola multiflora
Gloxinia purpurascens = Seemannia purpurascens
Gloxinia racemosa = Gloxiniopsis racemosa
Gloxinia reflexa = Monopyle reflexa
Gloxinia rupestris = Mandirola rupestris
Gloxinia sarmentiana = Sphaerorrhiza sarmentiana
Gloxinia speciosa = Sinningia speciosa
Gloxinia sylvatica = Seemannia sylvatica

References and external links
Roalson, E.H., J.K. Boggan, L.E., Skog, & E.A. Zimmer. 2005. Untangling the Gloxinieae (Gesneriaceae). I. Phylogenetic patterns and generic boundaries inferred from nuclear, chloroplast, and morphological cladistic data sets. Taxon 54 (2): 389-410.
Roalson, E.H., J.K. Boggan & L.E. Skog. 2005. Reorganization of tribal and generic boundaries in the Gloxinieae (Gesneriaceae: Gesnerioideae) and the description of a new tribe in the Gesnerioideae, Sphaerorrhizeae. Selbyana 25 (2): 225-238.
Wiehler, H. 1976. A report on the classification of Achimenes, Eucodonia, Gloxinia, and Anetanthus (Gesneriaceae). Selbyana 1 (4): 374-404.

Specific

External links
Anodiscus, Gloxinia, and Koellikeria from The Genera of Gesneriaceae
Diastema, Gloxinia, Phinaea and Related Intergenerics from the Gesneriad Reference Web

Gesnerioideae
Gesneriaceae genera